La Sombra de Chicago or La Sombra de Tony Guerrero or even the  Windy City Boys is a Tejano band founded by Tony Guerrero. Originally from the Chicago suburb of Aurora, Illinois, the group gained national acclaim and success after moving to Corpus Christi, Texas, the headquarters of their label, Freddie Records.

Career
La Sombra released over twenty full-length studio albums featuring songs in both Spanish and English. Following numerous line-up changes, the group disbanded in 1995, briefly reuniting in 2008 for a number of live shows.

La Sombra has been credited with influencing the Tejano and cumbia music fields in terms of musical style, dress, and concert performances as well as a generation of newer artists including the Kumbia Kings.

Select discography

Studio albums
 Mi Guerita Coca-Cola (1984)(First album on Freddie Records and debut)
 Where's The Beef? (1984)
 No Hay Derecho (1984)
 Eres Tu Muchachita (1985)
 Sombra Love (1985)
 Botoncito De Cariño (1985)
 All I Could Do Was Cry (1986)
 From The Streets Of Chicago (1987)
 La Sombra Introduces La Rebeldia (1987)
 Strikes Again (1988)
 Chicago's Wild Side (1988)
 One Of A Kind (1988)
 The Chi-Town Boys R Back (1989)
 Good Boys Wear White (1990) (Last album on Freddie Records)
 Porque Te Quiero (1991) (First album on Fonovisa)
 Intocable (1992)
 Ilusiones (1993)
 Caliente Dulce Amor (1994) (Last album on Fonovisa)
 Mas Que Todo (1995) (First album on EMI Latin)
 Alborotados (1997) (Last album on EMI Latin)
 Todo Me Recuerda A Ti (1999)

Compilations 
 Come Together (1985)
 Double Shot (1988)
 Greatest Hits Vol. 1 (1990)
 Greatest Hits Vol. 2 (1991)
 Awesome (1991)
 The Greatest Show On Earth (1991)
 Lo Mejor (1993)
 10th Anniversary (1994)
 Our Very Best (1995)
 Las Mejores Cumbias (1995)
 30 Greatest Hits (1997)
 30 Greatest Hits Vol. 2 (2000)
 In Concert (2001)
 30 Greatest Hits Vol. 3 (2002)
 The Original Recordings (2004)
 Mano A Mano (2004)
 20 Exitos De Recuerdo (2005)
 The Original Recordings 2 (2005)
 Anthology (2007)
 Battle of The 80s (2008)

Band members
 Antonio "Tony" Guerrero Jr. - lead vocals, background vocals, accordion
 Gavino Guerrero - lead vocals, background vocals, trumpet (1979 - 1994)
 Cruz Guerrero - keyboards, background vocals
 Albert "Tiger" Diaz - trumpet, saxophone, background vocals (1985 - 1989)
 Rene Limas - keyboards (1984 - 1987) 
 Ceaser Mojica - keyboards, vocals (1988) 
 Jesse Huerta - drums, background vocals (1977 - 1995)
 Lorenzo "Chencho" Benavides - lead vocals (1977 - 1981)
 Jose "Pepper" Gonzales - guitar (1978 - 1993) 
 Harvey Gonzales - bass guitar, background vocals (1978 - 1995)
 Frankie Trevino - guitar (1985 - 1987)
 Alex "Pretty Boy" Ramirez - keyboards, accordion (1989 - 1995)
 Ray Talamantez Jr. - trumpet, saxophone, vocals
Rogelio Zavala Jr.-Keyboards, vocals 
 Alex (Chuco) Gutierrez - keyboards, vocals (1986)
 Adam Vargas - guitar
 Cruz Martínez - keyboard (1989–1996)
 Andrew Maes - background vocals
 Bobby Rios - bass guitar and vocals (1996-Current)
Rene Ximenez - drums (1999,2000, 2009,2010)
 Roland Gutierrez - keyboards 
 Jesse Colon - trumpet (1981 – 1984)
 Joel Garza - drums (1994 – 1995)
 Joe Eric Griego - drums (1997)

External links
 La Sombra de Tony Guerrero at MySpace.com

Musical groups established in 1977
Rock music groups from Illinois
Tejano music groups
Musical groups from Chicago